George Goyan (born Gevorg OvsepovichTer Nikogosyan, (born November 10, 1901 - date of death unknown) was a Doctor of Theater Studies and Art History (1949), and a Meritorious Artist Armenian SSR (1961).

He was born in Tiflis. In 1944 he took part in Yerevan State Institute of Theatre and Cinematography, then taught there until 1949. He is the author of several works on the history of theater, the most significant of which are those on the history of Russian theatre in the seventeenth century, such as "2000 years of Armenian Theatre "(1952).

External links 
Theatre - Ancient Armenia
Theatre - Medieval Armenian

1901 births
Ethnic Armenian historians
Year of death missing
Writers from Tbilisi
People from Tiflis Governorate
Armenian people from the Russian Empire
Georgian people of Armenian descent
Soviet Armenians
Soviet historians